Barry George Strange (13 May 1934 – 24 June 2007) was an Australian rules footballer who played for New Town, later Glenorchy, in the Tasmanian Australian National Football League (TANFL). He is a member of the Tasmanian Football Hall of Fame after being inducted in 2005 and is a centre half back in Glenorchy's official 'Team of the Century'.

It was at centre half back that Strange played most of his football and he began his career at New Town in 1952. A dual Best and fairest winner, he was a member of New Town's 1953, 1955 and 1956 premiership sides before crossing to Penguin as captain-coach in 1958. Strange spent three seasons at the NWFU club then returned to New Town, who had been renamed Glenorchy, and played in another premiership in 1965. His final season was 1966.

Strange represented Tasmania in 10 interstate matches and was an All-Australian for his efforts at the 1956 Perth Carnival. He also participated in Tasmania's famous upset victory over the VFL at Launceston in 1960.

References

Australian rules footballers from Tasmania
Glenorchy Football Club players
Penguin Football Club players
All-Australians (1953–1988)
Tasmanian Football Hall of Fame inductees
1934 births
2007 deaths